K. B. Blues is an album by guitarist Kenny Burrell recorded in 1957 and originally released on the Japanese Blue Note label in 1979. The tracks were reissued on CD as part of Introducing Kenny Burrell: The First Blue Note Sessions but incorrectly identified as being recorded in 1956.

Reception

Allmusic awarded the album 3 stars and reviewer Michael Erlewine says it is "worth searching for".

Track listing 
All compositions by Kenny Burrell except as indicated
 "Nica's Dream" (Horace Silver) - 9:37
 "Out for Blood" - 9:06
 "K.B. Blues" - 6:24
 "D.B. Blues" (Lester Young) - 5:50
 "K.B. Blues" [Alternate Take] - 6:16

Personnel 
Kenny Burrell - guitar
Horace Silver - piano
Hank Mobley - tenor saxophone
Doug Watkins - bass
Louis Hayes - drums

References 

Kenny Burrell albums
1979 albums
Blue Note Records albums
Albums produced by Alfred Lion
Albums recorded at Van Gelder Studio